Sex and Food: The Best of The Pursuit of Happiness is a greatest hits album by Canadian rock band The Pursuit of Happiness, released in 2000.

Track listing

2000 greatest hits albums
The Pursuit of Happiness (band) albums